Zo (also spelled Zou and also known as Zokam) is a Northern Kuki-Chin-Mizo language originating in western Burma and spoken also in Mizoram and Manipur in northeastern India.

The name Zou is sometimes used as a cover term for the languages of all Mizo people (Zo people) i.e.Kukish and Chin peoples, especially the Zomi people. 

The term 'Zo' has been employed in many books to denote the word 'Zo', for simple reason of phonetic usage.

The Zo themselves employ the various terms Zo, Zou, and Jo to mean their tribe.

Phonology 

The set of 23 Zou consonantal phonemes can be established on the basis of the following minimal pairs or overlapping words. Besides these 23 Phonemes, 1 consonant is a borrowed phoneme (i.e. /r/), which is found only in loan words, in very rare cases (e.g. /r/ in /rəŋ/ "color"). Along with these consonants, Zou has 7 vowels: i, e, a, ɔ, o, u, ə.

Orthography

Vowels
 a - [a]
 aw - [ɔ]
 e - [e/ə]
 i - [i~j]
 o - [o]
 u - [u~w]

Consonants
 b - [b]
 ch - [c]
 d - [d]
 g - [g]
 h - [h], [ʔ] at the end of a syllable
 j - [ɟ]
 k - [k]
 kh - [kʰ]
 l - [l]
 m - [m]
 n - [n]
 ng - [ŋ]
 p - [p]
 ph - [pʰ]
 r - [r]
 s - [s]
 t - [t]
 th - [tʰ]
 v - [ʋ]
 z - [z]

Types of Zo verbs 
The Zo verbs can be classified into three types: Stem (1), Stem (2), Stem (3) as given below:

Sample text
The following is a sample text in Zou.

There are four major dialects of Zou in Myanmar and India: Haidawi, Khuongnung, Thangkhal, and Khodai.

Numbers
Zomi numbers are counted as follows:

Writing systems
Zou is often written in a Latin script developed by Christian missionary J.H. Cope. In 1952, M. Siahzathang of Churachandpur created an alternative script known as Zolai or Zoulai, an alphabetic system with some alphasyllabic characteristics.  The user community for the script is growing- Zou cultural, political, and literary organizations began to adopt the script beginning in the 1970s, and more recently, the Manipur State Government has shown support for both Siahzathang and the script.

Linguistic relations
As can be seen from the name Zo ("of the hills") and Mizoram ("people of the hill country"), Zo among the Northern Kuki-Chin-Mizo languagess is closely related to the Central languages such as the Duhlian (Lusei/Lushai) or Mizo language (endonym in Duhlian or Lushai is Mizo ṭawng), the   lingua franca language of Mizoram.

Zou as spoken in India is similar to the Paite language of the Paite, though Zou lacks the word-final glottal stops present in Paite.

Geographical extent
At its largest extent, the geographic area covered by the language group is a territory of approximately 60,000 square miles (160,000 km2) in size, in Burma, India and Bangladesh. However political boundaries and political debates have distorted the extent of the area in some sources.

In Burma
It is used in Chin State, Tiddim, and the Chin Hills. Use of Burmese has increased in the Zo speaking Chin State since the 1950s. Ethnologue reports that Zou is spoken in the following townships of Myanmar.

Chin State: Tonzang, Hakha, and Tedim townships
Sagaing Division: Kalay, Khampat, and Tamu townships

In India
Manipur
Chandel district: Singngat subdivision and the Sungnu Sachih / Kana area
Churachandpur district
Mizoram
Assam

In Bangladesh
In Bangladesh it is used by the Bawm people(Mizo people).

References

Further reading

External links
https://www.academia.edu/735120/Zo_Tonology
https://www.omniglot.com/writing/zou.htm

Kuki-Chin languages
Languages of Manipur